The year 1620 in science and technology involved some significant events.

Astronomy
 The work of Copernicus (died 1543) is edited and released, as directed by the Congregation of the Index (reading forbidden in March 1616): nine sentences, which state the heliocentric system as certain, are either omitted or changed.

Cartography
 The atlas Atlante geografico d'Italia, compiled by Giovanni Antonio Magini, is published posthumously.

Chemistry
 The scientific method of reasoning is expounded by Francis Bacon in his Novum Organum.

Earth sciences
 Francis Bacon notices the jigsaw fit of the opposite shores of the Atlantic Ocean.

Medicine
 Nicholas Habicot, surgeon to the Duke of Nemours, publishes a report of four successful "bronchotomies" which he has performed; these include the first recorded case of a tracheotomy for the removal of a thrombus and the first pediatric tracheotomy, to extract a foreign body from a 14-year-old's esophagus.

Technology
 May 17 – The first carousel is seen at a fair (Philippapolis, Turkey).
 Cornelis Drebbel builds the first navigable submarine, in England.

Births
 April? – William Brouncker, Anglo-Irish mathematician (died 1684)
 July 21 – Jean Picard, French astronomer (died 1682)
 September 25 – François Bernier, French physician and traveller (died 1688)
 December 23 - Johann Jakob Wepfer, Swiss pathologist and pharmacologist (died 1695) 
 Ralph Bathurst, English theologian, physician and academic (died 1704)
 Bernard de Gomme, Dutch-born military engineer (died 1685)
 Edme Mariotte, French physicist and priest (died 1684)
 Robert Morison, Scottish botanist and taxonomist (died 1683)

Deaths
 Simon Stevin, Flemish scientist (born c. 1548)

References

 
17th century in science
1620s in science